Lawalong (also written as Lowalang) is a village and gram panchayat in the Lawalong CD block in the Simaria subdivision of  the Chatra district in the Indian state of Jharkhand.

Geography

Location

Area overview
The map alongside shows that the forests (mark the light shading), covering around 60% of Chatra district, are evenly spread across the district. The map provides links to three CCL operational areas.

Note: The map alongside presents some of the notable locations in the district. All places marked in the map are linked in the larger full screen map.

Demographics
According to the 2011 Census of India, Lowalang (location code 348604) had a total population of 2,582, of which 1,416 (55%) were males and 1,166 (45%) were females. Population in the age range 0–6 years was 456. The total number of literate persons in Lowalang was 1,466 (68.96% of the population over 6 years).

Civic administration

Police station
Lawalong police station serves Lawalong CD block.

CD block HQ
Headquarters of Lawalong CD block is at Lawalong village.

Lawalong Wildlife Sanctuary
The beat office of Lawalong Beat of Lawalong Wildlife Sanctuary is situated at Lawalong village.

References

Villages in Chatra district